Kolë Berisha (26 October 1947 – 29 August 2021) was a politician who served as the Chair of Assembly of Kosovo from March 2006 to 2007. Berisha was also a deputy leader of the Democratic League of Kosovo. He had entered the political scene after a successful career in education in Klina, his hometown.

He had a law degree from the University of Priština.

Kolë Berisha was married and had two children. He died in August 2021 at the age of 73.

References

External links
Kolë Berisha | Kosovo Parliament website

1947 births
2021 deaths
People from Klina
Chairmen of the Assembly of the Republic of Kosovo
Democratic League of Kosovo politicians
University of Pristina alumni